Maskwacis Cree Tribal Council is a Tribal Council representing four First Nation communities in central Alberta, Canada. The council is based in Maskwacis, Alberta.

Member First Nations
Current First Nation members are:
 Ermineskin Cree Nation
 Louis Bull Tribe
 Montana First Nation
 Samson Cree Nation

References

First Nations tribal councils
Indigenous organizations in Alberta
First Nations in Alberta